The 1913 American Cup was the annual open cup held by the American Football Association. This marked the twelfth time a New Jersey team won the tournament and the third time for this year's winner the Paterson True Blues. It took three matches for them to overcome their final opponents Tacony of Philadelphia aka the 'Tacks'. Another notable encounter between New Jersey teams was a four game duel between Newark Caledonians and the Paterson Rangers in the second round. They battled to 0-0, 2-2, and 1-1 draws before the Caledonians surpassed the Rangers 1-0 in the fourth game. This edition was also the first time the final was played in Philadelphia.

American Cup Bracket

a) aggregate after 4 games
b) aggregate after 3 games

Final

First replay

Second replay

Lineups:Paterson- Esplin, Wilson(c), Murray, Forfar, Clark, Hudson, Ford, Lowe, Lynch, Gradwell, Neilson.Tacony- Ness, Small, McKelvey, Kennedy, Morrison(c), Richardson, Alexander, Kemp, Owens, Miller, Andrews.

See also
1913 American Amateur Football Association Cup

Amer
American Cup